Gradsko is a municipality in the eastern part of North Macedonia. Gradsko is also the name of the village where the municipal seat is found. Gradsko Municipality is part of the Vardar Statistical Region.

Geography
The municipality borders 
Veles Municipality and Lozovo Municipality to the north, 
Štip Municipality to the east, 
Čaška Municipality to the west, and 
Rosoman Municipality to the south.

Demographics
The municipality has 3,233 inhabitants, according to the 2021 census.
Ethnic groups in the municipality:

References

External links
 Official website

 
Vardar Statistical Region
Municipalities of North Macedonia